Kutub al-Lughah is a work of Hebrew linguistics by Saadia Gaon, twelve "Books on Language" which are also designated as the twelve parts of a work entitled "The Book on Language", in which, as the author himself states in his "Sefer ha-Galui", he sought to explain the "i'rab", or the grammatical formation of the Hebrew language. Of this Hebrew grammar, which is the oldest one known, fragments of greater or less extent have been preserved, especially in Saadia's commentary on Sefer Yetzirah and by Dunash ben Labrat.

Linguistics books
Hebrew language